Haig is an unincorporated community in Scotts Bluff County, Nebraska, United States.

History
Haig (also historically called Haigville) got its start when the Union Pacific Railroad was extended to that point. It was named for Harry Haig, described in one source as a local "cowboy".

A post office was established in Haig (Haigville) in 1914, and remained in operation until being discontinued in 1963.

References

Unincorporated communities in Scotts Bluff County, Nebraska
Unincorporated communities in Nebraska